Žerovjane is a village in the municipality of Bogovinje, North Macedonia.

History
According to the 1467-68 Ottoman defter, Žerovjane appears as being largely inhabited by an Orthodox Christian Albanian population. Due to Slavicisation, some families had a mixed Slav-Albanian anthroponomy - usually a Slavic first name and an Albanian last name or last names with Albanian patronyms and Slavic suffixes. 

The names are: Petko (Petër), son of Gjon; Dimitri Arbanas (t. Arnaut); Nikolisha Arbanas (t. Arnaut); Velko Arbanas (t. Arnaut); Milush Drll-iq; Mustafa Agrijan; widow Dona; Lazar Arbanas; Ivan, son of Gjon; Nikolla, the son of Tona.

Demographics
As of the 2021 census, Žerovjane had 891 residents with the following ethnic composition:
Albanians 881
Persons for whom data are taken from administrative sources 10

According to the 2002 census, the village had a total of 914 inhabitants. Ethnic groups in the village include:

Albanians 907
Macedonians 3
Turks 4

References

External links

Villages in Bogovinje Municipality
Albanian communities in North Macedonia